Kenneth Leon Nordtvedt  is an American physicist. He was born on April 16, 1939, in Chicago, Illinois. Nordtvedt graduated from the Massachusetts Institute of Technology (1960) and Stanford University (Ph.D., 1964) and was a junior fellow in the Harvard Society of Fellows (1963–1965). Soon after witnessing the Sputnik spacecraft cross the Boston sky in fall of 1957, he became a part-time student employee for the Mars Probe project at the MIT Instrumentation Lab, and in early 1960s was staff physicist at the same Laboratory's project to develop the Apollo Mission's navigation and guidance system.

Works

Theories of gravity 
In 1968 Nordtvedt calculated how and to what degree the gravitational-to-inertial mass ratio of gravitationally compact bodies—bodies with significant gravitational binding energy—will generally differ from one in gravity theories other than general relativity, and he then showed how lunar laser ranging data could be used to measure that key ratio to significant precision for the Earth.  He was a board member and scientific advisor overseeing the joint NASA-ESA Space Test of Equivalence Principle mission. In 1986 he was appointed by then President Ronald Reagan to the National Science Board.  He showed in 1988 that General Relativity's gravitomagnetism between Earth and Moon, as those bodies orbit the Sun, was essential to fitting the synodic month and half synodic month range signals from lunar laser ranging.  He had support from NASA and NSF for much of his research, as well as being a Sloan Fellow. His research was the subject of a Wall Street Journal article featured on the front page.

Tax policy 
Nordtvedt was elected to three terms in the Montana state legislature for a six-year period from 1979–1984, and there he wrote one of the first inflation indexing reforms of income tax law in the nation. He served briefly in 1989 as Director of the Montana Department of Revenue.

Genetic genealogy 
Nordtvedt is also an active genetic genealogist theorist. He has done his own research into genetic haplogroups, particularly the Y DNA group I, to which he belongs.

See also
Alternatives to general relativity
Galileo's Leaning Tower of Pisa experiment
Nordtvedt effect
Parameterized post-Newtonian formalism
Scalar–tensor theory

Selected Works
 1968 "Equivalence Principle for Massive Bodies" Phys. Rev. 169, 1017
 1968 "Testing Relativity with Laser Ranging to the Moon" Phys. Rev. 170, 1186
 1960 "Interplanetary Navigation System Study" MIT Instrumentation Laboratory Report R-273
 1964 "Preliminary Study of a Backup Manual Navigation Scheme" MIT Instrumentation Laboratory E-1540

References

1939 births
21st-century American physicists
American geneticists
American relativity theorists
Fellows of the American Physical Society
Living people
Massachusetts Institute of Technology alumni
Montana State University faculty
Stanford University alumni
Theoretical physicists